Major-General Dudley Graham Johnson,  (13 February 1884 – 21 December 1975) was a British Army officer and recipient of the Victoria Cross, the highest award for gallantry in the face of the enemy that can be awarded to British and Commonwealth forces.

Military career

Johnson served with the Wiltshire Regiment in the Second Boer War. He transferred to the South Wales Borderers upon graduating from the Royal Military College, Sandhurst in 1903.

He went to serve in World War I, earning the Distinguished Service Order in 1915 for bravery in late 1914, with the citation reading:

He was later awarded a bar to his DSO towards the end of the war, with the citation for the bar stating:

He was 34 years old, and an acting lieutenant-colonel in the South Wales Borderers, British Army, commanding the 2nd Battalion, Royal Sussex Regiment during the First World War when the following deed took place at the Sambre Canal, France for which he was awarded the VC.

Between the wars he attended the Staff College, Camberley from 1923 to 1924 and held a number of instruction and staff posts before being appointed commanding officer of the 2nd Battalion, North Staffordshire Regiment in 1928. He commanded the 12th (Secunderbad) Infantry Brigade in 1933 and became General Officer Commanding (GOC) of the 4th Division from 1938 to 1940. He was replaced as divisional commander after the Battle of Dunkirk in June 1940 and made GOC Aldershot Command later on in 1940 before becoming Inspector of Infantry in 1941. He retired in 1944 and was Colonel of the South Wales Borderers from 1944 to 1949.

His Victoria Cross is displayed at the South Wales Borderers Museum, Brecon, Powys, Wales.

Family
He was married to Marjorie Grisewood, who died in 1950. They had one son and two daughters and, after his wife's death, spent the last 25 years of his life a widower.

References

Bibliography

External links
Location of grave and VC medal (Hampshire)
Generals of World War II

|-
 

|-

 

1884 births
1975 deaths
South Wales Borderers officers
British World War I recipients of the Victoria Cross
British Army personnel of World War I
British Army generals of World War II
Companions of the Order of the Bath
People from Bourton-on-the-Water
Companions of the Distinguished Service Order
British Army personnel of the Second Boer War
British Army recipients of the Victoria Cross
Graduates of the Staff College, Camberley
Graduates of the Royal Military College, Sandhurst
People educated at Bradfield College
Wiltshire Regiment officers
North Staffordshire Regiment officers
British Army major generals
Burials in Hampshire
War Office personnel in World War II
Military personnel from Gloucestershire